Events in 1967 in Japanese television.

Debuts

|-

Ongoing shows
Music Fair, music (1964-present)
Hyokkori Hyō Tanjima, anime (1964-1969)

Endings

See also
1967 in anime
1967 in Japan
List of Japanese films of 1967

References